Raymond Burnier (1912-1968) was a Swiss photographer born in Lausanne.

Early life
Burnier was born in a wealthy Swiss family, his grandfather was among the inventor of the condensed milk, later commercialized by Nestle. Most of his childhood was spent in a farm in Algeria.

Career
Burnier was very passionate about photography. He traveled to China, Japan, Indonesia, Afghanistan, the United States to finally settle in India in 1938.

A follower of the Leica, he was interested in Hindu sculpture from the medieval period (9th to 14th centuries). He revealed the beauty of the great temples of Khajuraho Group of Monuments, Bhubaneswar and Konark Sun Temple. He became a member of the Indian archaeological services and photographed a large number of sites and temples in central India.

Influenced by the work of Cecil Beaton (that he receives in India), he inspired photographer Angelo Frontoni (it) (1929-2002).

Personal life
In 1931 in Cote D'Azur he met Alain Danielou who would remain his lifelong companion, even if in the middle of their relationship Burnier married Radha Sri Ram.

Exhibitions
 Center Alain Daniélou, Zagarolo, Rome (more than 8,000 negatives realized between 1935 and 1955).
 In 1949 he was the first photographer exhibited at Museum of Modern Art, New York (prints made by Burnier)
 Museum of the Elysee, Lausanne.

Works
 Burnier illustrated several works by Alain Daniélou: L'Erotisme Divinisé, The Hindu Temple: Deification of Eroticism, Visages de l'Inde médiévale, L'Inde traditionnelle. Photographies, 1935-1955.
 Exploring India's Sacred Art: Selected Writings of Stella Kramrisch 
 Alain Daniélou and Raymond Burnier, Faces of medieval India, Paris, Hermann, 1985, 79 original photographs

References

1912 births
1968 deaths
Bisexual men
People from Lausanne